As of 2015, all 50 U.S. states and the District of Columbia legally recognize and document same-sex relationships in some fashion, be it by same-sex marriage, civil union or domestic partnerships. Many counties and municipalities outside of these states also provide domestic partnership registries or civil unions which are not officially recognized by the laws of their states, are only valid and applicable within those counties, and are usually largely unaffected by state law regarding relationship recognition (except in some aspects). In addition, many cities and counties continue to provide their own domestic partnership registries while their states also provide larger registries (for all relationship recognitions); a couple can only maintain registration on one registry, requiring the couple to de-register from the state registry before registering with the county registry.

These are the cities and counties of United States which offer a domestic partnership and/or civil union classified by census region.

West Region

Pacific Division

Hawaii 
Same-sex marriages, civil unions, domestic partnerships (limited to state employees only) and reciprocal beneficiary relationships are all granted throughout the state to same-sex couples.

Alaska 
Same-sex marriages and domestic partnerships (limited to state employees only) are both granted throughout the state to same-sex couples.

 City and Borough of Juneau

Washington State  
Same-sex marriages are granted throughout the state to same-sex couples and all previous domestic partnerships (with the exception of couples with at least one member aged 62 or above) have automatically been converted into civil marriage.

 City of Anacortes
 City of Bellevue
 City of Bellingham
 City of Burien
 City of Des Moines
 City of Edmonds
 King County
 City of Lacey: Residents of the city. Both opposite- and same-sex couples.
 City of Newcastle
 City of Olympia: No residency requirement. Both opposite- and same-sex couples. Notarized applications are accepted by mail when accompanied by appropriate payment.
 Pierce County
 City of Seattle: No residency requirement. Both opposite- and same-sex couples. Notarized applications are accepted by mail when accompanied by appropriate payment.
 Snohomish County
 City of Spokane
 City of Tacoma
 City of Tumwater: Residents of the city. Both opposite- and same-sex couples.
 City of Vancouver

Oregon 
Same-sex marriages and domestic partnerships are both granted throughout the state to same-sex couples.

 City of Ashland: No residency requirement. Limited to same-sex couples.
 City of Corvallis
 City of Eugene: No residency requirement. Both opposite-sex and same-sex couples.
 City of Gresham: Limited to same-sex couples.
 Multnomah County: No residency requirement. Both partners must be present. Both opposite-sex and same-sex couples.
 City of Portland

California 
Same-sex marriage and domestic partnerships are both granted throughout the state to same-sex couples.

 Alameda County
 City of Berkeley: No residency requirement. Both opposite- and same-sex couples.
 City of Beverly Hills: No residency requirement. Both opposite- and same-sex couples.
 City of Cathedral City: Residents of the city. Both opposite- and same-sex couples.
 City of Claremont
 City of Davis: Residents of the city. Both opposite- and same-sex couples.
 City of Fremont
 City of Healdsburg
 City of Laguna Beach: No residency requirement. Both opposite- and same-sex couples.
 City of Long Beach: No residency requirement. Both opposite- and same-sex couples. Benefits include visitation rights in hospitals and correctional facilities equal to those given to a spouse.
 Los Angeles County : Residents of the county or at least one partner employed by the county. Both opposite- and same-sex couples.
 Marin County: Residents of the county or at least one partner employed in the county. Limited to same-sex couples.
 City of Modesto
 City of Oakland: Residents of the city or at least one partner employed by the city. Both opposite- and same-sex couples.
 City of Palm Springs: Residents of the city. Both opposite- and same-sex couples.
 City of Palo Alto: No residency requirement. Both opposite- and same-sex couples.
 City of Petaluma: Residents of the city or at least one partner employed in the city. Both opposite- and same-sex couples.
 City of Sacramento: Residents of the city. Both opposite- and same-sex couples.
 City of San Bruno
 City of San Diego
 City and County of San Francisco: Both partners residents of The City or at least one partner employed by City government. Both opposite- and same-sex couples.
 City of Santa Barbara: No residency requirement. Both opposite- and same-sex couples.
 Santa Barbara County : Residents of the county or at least one partner employed in the county. Both opposite- and same-sex couples.
 City of San Jose
 City of San Luis Obispo
 San Mateo County
 City of Santa Monica: No residency requirement. Both opposite- and same-sex couples.
 City of Santa Barbara
 City of Santa Cruz
 Santa Cruz County
 City of Santa Rosa
 City of Sebastopol
 Sonoma County
 Ventura County : Residents of the county or at least one partner employed by the county. Both opposite- and same-sex couples.
 City of West Hollywood: No residency requirement. Both opposite- and same-sex couples. Notarized applications are accepted by mail when accompanied by appropriate payment.

Mountain Division

Idaho 
Same-sex marriages are granted throughout the state to same-sex couples.

Montana 
Same-sex marriages and domestic partnerships (limited to state employees only) are both granted throughout the state to same-sex couples.

 City of Missoula: Residents of the city. Both opposite- and same-sex couples.
 Missoula County

Wyoming 
Same-sex marriage are granted throughout the state to same-sex couples.

Nevada 
Same-sex marriages and domestic partnerships are both granted throughout the state to same-sex couples.

Utah 
Same-sex marriages are granted throughout the state to same-sex couples.

 City of Salt Lake : The Mutual Commitment Registry is open to city residents.
 Salt Lake County : The Mutual Commitment Registry is open to city residents.

Colorado 
Same-sex marriages, civil unions and designated beneficiary agreements are all granted throughout the state to same-sex couples.

 City of Aspen
 City of Boulder: No residency requirement. Both opposite- and same-sex couples.
 City of Denver: No residency requirement. Both opposite- and same-sex couples.
 Eagle County
 City of Glendale

Arizona 
Same-sex marriages and domestic partnerships (limited to state employees only) are both granted throughout the state to same-sex couples.

 City of Bisbee
 Town of Clarkdale
 City of Cottonwood
 City of Flagstaff : Must be resident of Flagstaff
 Town of Jerome
 City of Phoenix: Must be resident of Phoenix. Both opposite- and same-sex couples.
 Pima County
 City of Scottsdale
 City of Sedona
 City of Tempe : Both opposite- and same-sex couples.
 City of Tucson : No residency requirement. Both opposite- and same-sex couples.

New Mexico 
Same-sex marriages and domestic partnerships (limited to state employees only) are both granted throughout the state to same-sex couples.

 City of Albuquerque: Both opposite- and same-sex couples.
 City of Santa Fe: Both opposite- and same-sex couples.

Midwest Region

West North Central Division

North Dakota 
Same-sex marriages are granted throughout the entire state to same-sex couples.

South Dakota 
Same-sex marriages are granted throughout the entire state to same-sex couples.

Minnesota 
Same-sex marriages are granted throughout the entire state to same-sex couples.

 City of Crystal: At least one partner must reside or work in the city. Both opposite- and same-sex couples.
 City of Duluth: No residency requirement. Both opposite- and same-sex couples.
 City of Eagan: Residents of the city. Both opposite- and same-sex couples.
 City of Eden Prairie: Must work or live in Eden Prairie, Minn. Both opposite- and same-sex couples.
 City of Edina: Must work or live in Edina, Minn. Both opposite- and same-sex couples.
 City of Falcon Heights: At least one partner must reside or work in the city. Both opposite- and same-sex couples.
 City of Golden Valley: Residents of the city. Both opposite- and same-sex couples.
 City of Maplewood
 City of Minneapolis: No residency requirement. Both opposite- and same-sex couples.
 City of Northfield
 City of Red Wing: At least one partner must reside or work in the city. Both opposite- and same-sex couples.
 City of Richfield: At least one partner must live or work in Richfield. Both opposite- and same-sex couples.
 City of Robbinsdale: Residents of the city. Both opposite- and same-sex couples.
 City of Rochester: No residency requirement. Both opposite- and same-sex couples.
 City of Saint Paul: No residency requirement. Both opposite- and same-sex couples.
 City of Shorewood
 City of St. Louis Park: At least one partner must reside or work in the city. Both opposite- and same-sex couples.

Nebraska 
Same-sex marriages are granted throughout the entire state to same-sex couples.

Iowa 
Same-sex marriages and domestic partnerships (limited to state employees only) are both granted throughout the entire state to same-sex couples.

 Floyd County: Employees of the county. Both opposite- and same-sex couples.
 City of Iowa City: No residency requirement. Both opposite- and same-sex couples.

Kansas 
Same-sex marriages are granted throughout the entire state to same-sex couples.

 City of Lawrence: Both individuals must be residents of the City of Lawrence, Kansas. Both opposite- and same-sex couples.
 City of Topeka:  Both be residents of the city of Topeka. Share a common permanent residence. Agree to be in a relationship of mutual interdependence. Each be at least 18 years old and mentally competent to enter into a contract.  Not be related by blood as defined by Kansas law. Agree to file a Declaration of Domestic Partnership with the city of Topeka.

Missouri 
Same-sex marriages are granted throughout the entire state to same-sex couples.

 City of Clayton: Residents of the city. Both opposite- and same-sex couples.
 City of Columbia: No residency requirement. Both opposite- and same-sex couples.
 Jackson County: Residents of the city. Both opposite- and same-sex couples.
 City of Kansas City: Residents of the city. Both opposite- and same-sex couples.
 City of Olivette: No residency requirement. Both opposite- and same-sex couples.
 City of St. Louis: Residents of the city. Both opposite- and same-sex couples.
 University City: Residents of the city. Both opposite- and same-sex couples.

East North Central Division

Wisconsin 
Same-sex marriages are granted throughout the entire state to same-sex couples.

 City of Appleton
 Dane County: Residents of the county. Both opposite- and same-sex couples.
 City of Eau Claire: City employees only. Both opposite- and same-sex couples.
 City of Janesville
 Kenosha County : Residents of the county. Both opposite- and same-sex couples.
 City of Madison: Residents of the city. Both opposite- and same-sex couples.
 City of Manitowoc
 City of Milwaukee: Residents in Milwaukee County.  Limited to same-sex couples.
 Milwaukee County
 City of Racine: City employees only. Only applies to state-registered domestic partners, which are defined by state law as same-sex couples.
 Rock County : Residents of the county. Both opposite- and same-sex couples.
 Village of Shorewood Hills

Michigan 
Same-sex marriages are granted throughout the entire state to same-sex couples.

 City of Ann Arbor: No residency requirement. Both opposite- and same-sex couples. Notarized applications are accepted by mail when accompanied by appropriate payment.
 City of Detroit: No residency requirement. Both opposite- and same-sex couples.
 City of East Lansing
 Ingham County
 City of Kalamazoo: Both opposite- and same-sex couples.
 Washtenaw County: Both opposite- and same-sex couples.
 Wayne County: Both opposite- and same-sex couples.

Illinois 
Same-sex marriage, civil unions and domestic partnerships (limited to state employees only) are all granted throughout the entire state to same-sex couples.

 City of Champaign
 Champaign County: Employees of the county.
 City of Chicago: Limited to same-sex couples.
 Cook County: Limited to same-sex couples.
 Village of Oak Park: Residents of the city. Limited to same-sex couples.
 City of Urbana: No residency requirement. Both opposite- and same-sex couples.

Indiana 
Same-sex marriages are granted throughout the entire state to same-sex couples.

 City of Bloomington: No residency requirement. Both opposite- and same-sex couples.
 City of Carmel: No residency requirement. Both opposite- and same-sex couples.
 City of Indianapolis: No residency requirement. Both opposite- and same-sex couples.

Ohio 
Same-sex marriages are granted throughout the entire state to same-sex couples.

 City of Athens: No residency requirement. Both opposite- and same-sex couples.
 City of Cincinnati: Employees of the city. Both opposite- and same-sex couples.
 City of Cleveland: No residency requirement. Both opposite- and same-sex couples.
 City of Cleveland Heights: No residency requirement. Both opposite- and same-sex couples.
 City of Columbus: No residency requirement. Both opposite- and same-sex couples.
 Cuyahoga County: At least one partner must be employed by the county. Same-sex couples only.
 City of Dayton: No residency requirement. Both opposite- and same-sex couples.
 Franklin County
 City of Lakewood
 City of Oberlin
 City of Toledo: No residency requirement. Both opposite- and same-sex couples.
 Village of Yellow Springs: No residency requirement. Both opposite- and same-sex couples.

North-East Region

New England Division

Vermont 

Same-sex marriages and domestic partnerships (limited to state employees only) are both granted throughout the entire state to same-sex couples.

 City of Burlington
 Town of Middlebury

Rhode Island 

Same-sex marriages and domestic partnerships (limited to state employees only) are both granted throughout the entire state to same-sex couples and all previous civil unions were automatically converted into same sex marriages.

 City of Providence

New Hampshire 
Same-sex marriages are granted throughout the entire state to same-sex couples and all previous civil unions were automatically converted into same sex marriages.

 Town of Northwood
 Unincorporated community of West Lebanon

Maine 

Same-sex marriages and domestic partnerships are both granted throughout the entire state to same-sex couples.

 City of Falmouth
 City of Portland: Residents of the city. Benefits include the visitation rights at city health facilities equal to those given to a spouse. Same-sex couples only.

Massachusetts 
Same-sex marriages and domestic partnerships (limited state employees only) are both granted throughout the entire state to same-sex couples.

 City of Boston: No residency requirement. Both opposite- and same-sex couples.
 Town of Brewster: No residency requirement. Both opposite- and same-sex couples.
 Town of Brookline: No residency requirement. Limited to same-sex couples.
 City of Cambridge: No residency requirement. Both opposite- and same-sex couples. Benefits include visitation rights in hospitals and correctional facilities equal to those given to a spouse. A domestic partner, who is also the parent or legal guardian of a child, may file a form at or send a letter to the child's school to indicate that the parent's domestic partner shall have access to the child's records.
 Town of Nantucket: No residency requirement. Open to opposite- and same-sex couples.
 Town of Provincetown: No residency requirement for registrants. Both opposite- and same-sex couples. Benefits include visitation rights in hospitals and correctional facilities equal to those given to a spouse. A domestic partner, who is also the parent or legal guardian of a child, may file a form at or send a letter to the child's school to indicate that the parent's domestic partner shall have access to the child's records.

Connecticut 
Same-sex marriages and domestic partnerships (limited to state employees only) are both granted throughout the entire state to same-sex couples and all previous civil unions were automatically converted into same sex marriages.

 City of Hartford: No residency requirement. Both opposite- and same-sex couples.
 City of Mansfield

Middle Atlantic Division

New York State 
Same-sex marriages and domestic partnerships (limited to state employees only) are both granted throughout the entire state to same-sex couples.

 City of Albany: No residency requirement. Both opposite- and same-sex couples.name
 Albany County
 Town of Babylon: Residents of the town. Both opposite- and same-sex couples.
 Town of East Hampton: Both opposite-sex and same-sex couples.
 Village of Great Neck: Both opposite- and same-sex couples.
 Village of Great Neck Plaza: Both partners must be residents of the village, or at least one partner must be employed by the village. Both opposite- and same-sex couples.
 Township of Grennburgh
 Town of Huntingon: Residents of the town. Both opposite- and same-sex couples.
 City of Ithaca: No residency requirement. Both opposite-sex and same-sex couples.
 Town of Ithaca: Residents of the town or at least one partner employed by the town. Both opposite- and same-sex couples.
 Nassau County
 City of New Rochelle
 City of New York: Residents of the city or at least one partner employed by the city. Both opposite- and same-sex couples.
 Town of North Hempstead: Both partners must be residents of the town, or at least one partner must be employed by the town. Both opposite- and same-sex couples.
 Village of North Hills
 City of Rochester: No residency requirement. Both opposite- and same-sex couples.
 Rockland County: Residents of the county or at least one partner employed by the county government. Both opposite- and same-sex couples.
 Village of Roslyn Estates: Both partners must be residents of the village, or at least one partner must be employed by the village. Both opposite- and same-sex couples.
 Town of Southampton: Residents of the town. Both opposite-sex and same-sex couples.
 Town of Southold: At least one partner must be a resident of the town. Both opposite- and same-sex couples.
 Suffolk County: Residents of the county or at least one partner employed by the county. Both opposite- and same-sex couples.
 Westchester County: No residency requirement. Both opposite- and same-sex couples.

Pennsylvania 
Same-sex marriages are granted throughout the entire state to same-sex couples.

 City of Allentown: At least one partner must work or have worked for the city. Same-sex couples only.
 City of Harrisburg: Both opposite- and same-sex couples may register as "Life Partners" with the City of Harrisburg's Life Partnership Registry.
 Luzerne County: Same-sex couples only.
 City and County of Philadelphia: Residents of the city or at least one partner employed by the city. Both opposite- and same-sex couples.
 City of Pittsburgh: No residency requirement. Limited to same-sex couples.
 Borough of State College: No residency requirement. Both opposite- and same-sex couples.

New Jersey 
Same-sex marriages, civil unions, and domestic partnerships are all granted throughout the entire state to same-sex couples.

 Bergen County
 Township of Berkeley
 Township of Brick
 Camden County
 Gloucester County
 Township of Haddon
 Hudson County
 Township of Jackson
 City of Jersey
 Township of Maplewood
 Mercer County
 Monmouth County
 Morris County
 Township of Mount Holly
 Township of Mount Laurel
 Ocean County
 Passaic County
 City of Plainfield
 Borough of Princeton
 Township of South Orange
 Borough of Stone Harbor
 Borough of Stratford
 Union County
 Borough of Westville

South Region

West South Central Division

Oklahoma 
Same-sex marriages are granted throughout the entire state to same-sex couples.

Texas 
Same-sex marriages are granted throughout the entire state to same-sex couples.

 City of Austin: Employees of the city. Both opposite- and same-sex couples.
 Bexar County: Employees of the city. Both opposite- and same-sex couples.
 City of Dallas: Employees of the city. Both opposite- and same-sex couples.
 Dallas County: Employees of the county. Both opposite- and same-sex couples.
 City of El Paso: At least one partner must be employed by the city. Both opposite- and same-sex couples.
 El Paso County: Employees of the city. Both opposite- and same-sex couples.
 City of Fort Worth: Employees of the city. Both opposite- and same-sex couples.
 City of Houston: Employees of the city. Both opposite- and same-sex married couples.
 City of San Antonio: At least one partner must be employed by the city. Both opposite- and same-sex couples.
 Travis County: No residency requirement. Both opposite- and same-sex couples.

Arkansas 
Same-sex marriages are granted throughout the entire state to same-sex couples.

 City of Eureka Springs: No residency requirement. Both opposite- and same-sex couples.

Louisiana 
Same-sex marriages are granted throughout the entire state to same-sex couples.

 City and Parish of New Orleans: Residents of the city or at least one partner employed in the city. Both opposite- and same-sex couples.

East South Central Division

Kentucky 
Same-sex marriages are granted throughout the entire state to same-sex couples.

 City of Berea: Employees of the city. Both opposite- and same-sex couples.
 City of Covington: Employees of the city. Both opposite- and same-sex couples.
 City and County of Lexington: Employees of the city. Both opposite- and same-sex couples.
 City and County of Louisville: Employees of the city. Both opposite- and same-sex couples.

Tennessee 
Same-sex marriages are granted throughout the entire state to same-sex couples.

 City of Chattanooga: Employees of the city. Both opposite- and same-sex couples.
 City of Collegedale: Employees of the city. Both opposite- and same-sex couples.
 City of Knoxville: Employees of the city. Both opposite- and same-sex couples.
 City-County Government of Nashville-Davidson County: Employees of the city-county government. Both opposite- and same-sex couples.

Mississippi 
Same-sex marriages are granted throughout the entire state to same-sex couples.

Alabama 
Same-sex marriages are granted throughout the entire state to same-sex couples.

South Atlantic Division

Delaware 
Same-sex marriages and domestic partnerships (limited to state employees only) are both granted throughout the entire state to same-sex couples. All previous civil unions have been automatically converted into civil marriages.

Maryland 
Same-sex marriages and domestic partnerships are both granted throughout the entire state to same-sex couples.

 City of Baltimore
 City of College Park
 City of Greenbelt
 Howard County
 City of Hyattsville
 Montgomery County: Both opposite- and same-sex couples.
 City of Mount Rainier
 City of Takoma Park: No residency requirement. Both opposite- and same-sex couples.

Washington, DC 
Same-sex marriages and domestic partnerships are both granted in the entire district to same-sex couples.

West Virginia 
Same-sex marriages are granted throughout the entire state to same-sex couples.

Virginia 
Same-sex marriages are granted throughout the entire state to same-sex couples.

North Carolina 
Same-sex marriages are granted throughout the entire state to same-sex couples.

 City of Asheville: No residency requirement. Both opposite- and same-sex couples.
 Buncombe County: Employees of the county.
 Town of Carrboro: Residents of the town or at least one partner employed by the town. Both opposite- and same-sex couples.
 Town of Chapel Hill: No residency requirement. Both opposite- and same-sex couples.
 City of Charlotte
 City of Durham
 Durham County: Employees of the county. Same-sex couples only.
 City of Greensboro
 Mecklenburg County: Employees of the county. Same-sex couples only.
 Orange County

South Carolina 
Same-sex marriages are granted throughout the entire state to same-sex couples.

Georgia 
Same-sex marriages are granted throughout the entire state to same-sex couples.

 Athens-Clarke County: Residents of the county or at least one partner employed by the county. Both opposite- and same-sex couples.
 City of Atlanta: Residents of the city. Both opposite- and same-sex couples.
 City of Avondale Estates
 City of Clarkston: Residents of the city. Both opposite- and same-sex couples.
 City of Decatur: Residents of the city. Both opposite- and same-sex couples.
 DeKalb County
 City of Doraville
 City of East Point: Limited to same-sex couples.
 Fulton County: Residents of the county or at least one partner employed by the county. Limited to same-sex couples.
 City of Savannah: Health care benefits for city employees.
 City of Pine Lake

Florida 
Same-sex marriages are granted throughout the entire state to same-sex couples.

 City of Bay Harbor Islands
 Broward County: Residents of the county or at least one partner employed by the county. Both opposite- and same-sex couples.
 City of Cape Coral: No residency requirement. Both opposite- and same-sex couples.
 City of Clearwater: No residency requirement. Both opposite- and same-sex couples.
 City of Delray Beach
 City of Gainesville: No residency requirement. Both opposite- and same-sex couples.
 City of Hialeah
 Hillsborough County
 City of Juno Beach
 City of Jupiter
 City of Key West: No residency requirement. Both opposite- and same-sex couples.
 City of Kissimmee: Employees of the city. Both opposite- and same-sex couples.
 City of Lake Worth
 Leon County: No residency requirement. Both opposite- and same-sex couples.
 City of Margate: No residency requirement. Both opposite- and same-sex couples.
 City of Miami: Residents of the county or at least one partner employed by the county. Both opposite- and same-sex couples.
 City of Miami Beach: No residency requirement. Both opposite- and same-sex couples.
 Miami-Dade County: Residents of the county or at least one partner employed by the county. Both opposite- and same-sex couples.
 City of Miramar
 Monroe County: No residency requirement. Both opposite- and same-sex couples. County employment benefits only.
 City of North Miami
 Orange County: No residency requirement. Both opposite- and same-sex couples.
 City of Orlando: No residency requirement. Both opposite- and same-sex couples.
 Town of Palm Beach
 Palm Beach County: Residents of the county or at least one partner employed by the county. Both opposite- and same-sex couples.
 City of Pembroke Pines
 City of Pensacola: Both opposite- and same-sex couples.
 Pinellas County: Both opposite- and same-sex couples.
 City of Punta Gorda: Both opposite- and same-sex couples.
 City of Sarasota: No residency requirement. Both opposite- and same-sex couples. City employment benefits only.
 Sarasota County: Both opposite- and same-sex couples.
 South Miami: Residents of the county or at least one partner employed by the county. Both opposite- and same-sex couples.
 City of St. Cloud: Employees of the city. Both opposite- and same-sex couples.
 City of St. Petersburg: No residency requirement. Both opposite- and same-sex couples.
 City of Tallahassee
 City of Tampa: No residency requirement. Both opposite- and same-sex couples.
 City of Tavares: No residency requirement. Both opposite- and same-sex couples.
 City of Tequesta
 Volusia County: No residency requirement. Both opposite- and same-sex couples.
 City of West Palm Beach: No residency requirement. Both opposite- and same-sex couples.
 City of Wilton Manors

References

Domestic partnership
Law of the United States